Oenopota declivis is a species of sea snail, a marine gastropod mollusk in the family Mangeliidae.

Subspecies  Oenopota declivis angustior  (J.G. Jeffreys, 1877)

Description
The length of the shell varies between 9 mm and 20 mm.

The characters of this shell are close to Oenopota cinerea (Møller, 1842), but the shell is longer in the spire and narrower, with slightly stronger shoulder, fewer ribs and revolving striae. The sculpture is cancellated. The aperture is broadly truncate below.

Distribution
This species occurs in European waters, in the Northwest Atlantic Ocean and in the arctic waters of Canada and off Nova Zembla, Russia

References

 Lovén, Sven Ludvig. Index molluscorum: litora Scandinaviæ occidentalia habitantium. Faunæ prodromum. PA Norstedt, 1846.
 Gofas, S.; Le Renard, J.; Bouchet, P. (2001). Mollusca, in: Costello, M.J. et al. (Ed.) (2001). European register of marine species: a check-list of the marine species in Europe and a bibliography of guides to their identification. Collection Patrimoines Naturels, 50: pp. 180–213

External links
 
 

declivis
Gastropods described in 1846